Launcelot Matthew "Lance" Johnson (9 August 1897 – 11 January 1983) was a New Zealand rugby union player. He played 25 matches for the All Blacks including four internationals. He served as a  selector from 1949 to 1950.

Johnson enlisted in the New Zealand Rifle Brigade in August 1917 with the rank of rifleman, and arrived in France in September 1918, two months before the end of World War I. During World War II he served as a warrant officer in the National Reserve between 1940 and 1943.

References

1897 births
1983 deaths
People from Lumsden, New Zealand
People educated at Southland Boys' High School
New Zealand rugby union players
New Zealand international rugby union players
Wellington rugby union players
Hawke's Bay rugby union players
Rugby union fly-halves
Rugby union centres
New Zealand referees and umpires
New Zealand military personnel of World War I
New Zealand military personnel of World War II
Rugby union players from Southland, New Zealand